The Zénith Limoges Métropole (also known as the Concert Hall in Limoges) is an indoor amphitheater designed by famous architect Bernard Tschumi. This building is located in a wooded area on the outskirts of the city of Limoges in central France. The concert hall in Limoges can accommodate up to 6,000 spectators.

About
Basic Details
Site Area: 
Main Building Area: 
Building Dimensions:  (in diameter)
Height: 
Levels: 3 stories of backstage area
Capacity: 6,047
Parking Capacity: 1,500-vehicles-capacity parking surface 
Completion: Spring 2007
Inauguration Date: March 8, 2007
Total Budget: US$36.6 million 
Competition: 1st prize, 2003

Staff
Partners-in-charge: Bernard Tschumi, Véronique Descharrières
Lead Designer: Bernard Tschumi
Project Architects: Jean Jacques Hubert, Antoine Santiard, Joël Rutten
Team Architects:    Anne Save de Beaurecueil, Chong-Zi Chen, Nicolas Cazeli, Mathieu Göetz, Lara Herro, Robert Holton, Sarrah Khan, Joong Sub Kim, Alan Kusov, Dominic Leong, Michaela Metcalf, Alex Reid, Vincent Prunier et Sylviane Brossard
Landscape Architect: Michel Desvigne
Site Architect: ArchitectAtelier 4
Research office: Technip TPS with Jaillet & Rouby and Naterrer Bois Consult
Staging Consultant: Scène
Acoustics Cial: Landscape Architect Michel Desvigne avec Sol Paysage
Facade Advisor: Hugh Dutton Associates
HQE Engineer: Michel Raoust
Graphics and Signage: Benoît Santiard
Photography: Peter Mauss/Esto, Christian Richters

References

Buildings and structures in Limoges
Concert halls in France
Music venues completed in 2007
Tourist attractions in Haute-Vienne
Bernard Tschumi buildings
Indoor arenas in France
Music venues in France
21st-century architecture in France